Superfoot can refer to:
 Bill Wallace (martial arts)
 Board foot, a unit of measurement in the timber industry
 Johnny Morris Davis